Jugla is a neighbourhood of Riga, the capital of Latvia. It is located in the Vidzeme Suburb, west of the Lake Jugla and southeast of the Lake Ķīšezers. Jugla is bordered by Čiekurkalns, Mežciems and Teika to the west, Dreiliņi to the southwest, Brekši to the southeast and Bukulti to the east.

Jugla is the location of Strazdumuiža Manor, first mentioned in 1528.

References

Neighbourhoods in Riga